Lakes of the Four Seasons is a census-designated place (CDP) in Lake and Porter counties in the U.S. state of Indiana. The population was 7,033 at the 2010 census.

Geography
The county line of Porter and Lake counties runs directly through the center of the Four Seasons. While the entire community, both the Porter and Lake County sides, have Crown Point mailing addresses, the school districts attended by the children who reside within the community are separated by county. Residents on the Porter County side are considered part of the Porter Township school system, whereas those on the Lake County side are in the Crown Point school system.

Lakes of the Four Seasons is located at  (41.407824, -87.217953).

The Lakes of the Four Seasons consist of Lake Holiday, an impoundment on the East Branch of Stony Run, plus Big Bass Lake, Lake on the Green, and Trouthaven Lake. Big Bass Lake connects to Lake Holiday, which via Stony Run drains south and west to the Kankakee River, part of the Illinois River watershed. Lake on the Green has no surface outlet, while Trouthaven Lake drains northwest to the Deep River, which winds north to the Little Calumet River and Lake Michigan.

Demographics

As of the census of 2000, there were 7,291 people, 2,506 households, and 2,155 families residing in the CDP. The racial makeup of the CDP was 97.06% White, 0.12% African American, 0.21% Native American, 0.77% Asian, 0.01% Pacific Islander, 0.64% from other races, and 1.18% from two or more races. Hispanic or Latino of any race were 3.90% of the population.

There were 2,506 households, out of which 41.6% had children under the age of 18 living with them, 76.5% were married couples living together, 6.6% had a female householder with no husband present, and 14.0% were non-families. 11.9% of all households were made up of individuals, and 4.7% had someone living alone who was 65 years of age or older. The average household size was 2.91 and the average family size was 3.16.

In the CDP, the population was spread out, with 28.0% under the age of 18, 6.9% from 18 to 24, 27.0% from 25 to 44, 27.7% from 45 to 64, and 10.4% who were 65 years of age or older. The median age was 39 years. For every 100 females, there were 97.6 males. For every 100 females age 18 and over, there were 95.2 males.

The median income for a household in the CDP was $67,528, and the median income for a family was $68,903. Males had a median income of $52,222 versus $28,964 for females. The per capita income for the CDP was $25,537. About 2.5% of families and 2.6% of the population were below the poverty line, including 5.3% of those under age 18 and 3.3% of those age 65 or over.

References

Census-designated places in Lake County, Indiana
Census-designated places in Porter County, Indiana
Census-designated places in Indiana